Stau may refer to one of the following:
In particle physics, stau is a slepton which is the hypothetical superpartner of a tau lepton
An obsolete letter Stigma in the Greek alphabet
In German, stau is a word meaning 'traffic jam'
One common abbreviation of St. Augustine High School (disambiguation)
In the fictional  Vulcan language, stau is the verb 'to kill'
An alternate name for the Horpa language